Hausmann is a German word with former meanings "householder" and "freeholder" and current meaning "house-husband."

Hausmann (Hausman), Haussmann (Haussman), Haußmann, Hauszmann, etc. are German-origin surnames that may refer to:

Hausmann 
 Caspar Herman Hausmann (1653–1718), Danish-Norwegian General, lumber merchant and squire
 Carl Hausman (born 1953), Author, journalist, and educator
 Christian Hausmann (born 1963), German football player
 Clem Hausmann (1919–1972), Major League baseball pitcher
 David Hausmann  (born 1979), German fencer
 George Hausmann (1916–2004), Major League baseball player
 Jake Hausmann (born 1998), American football player
 Johann Friedrich Ludwig Hausmann (1782–1859), German mineralogist
 Jürgen B. Hausmann (born 1964), pseudonym of Jürgen Beckers, German cabaret performer and comedian
 Larry Hausmann (born 1941), U.S. soccer midfielder
 Michel Hausmann (19??–), Venezuelan theater director and producer
 Raoul Hausmann (1886–1971), German Dadaist sculptor and writer from Vienna
 Ricardo Hausmann (born 1956), former minister of Venezuela and Professor at Harvard University
 Robert Hausmann (1852–1909), German cellist
 Sahra Hausmann (born 1973), Norwegian team handball player

Locations 
 The Theodore Hausmann Estate, historic site in Vero Beach, Florida
 16524 Hausmann (1991 BB3), main-belt asteroid, discovered 1991

Hausman 

 Alice Hausman (born 1942), Minnesota politician
 Daniel M. Hausman (born 1947), U.S. philosopher of economics
 Gerald Hausman  (born 1945), American author of books about Native America, animals, mythology, and West Indian culture
 Jerry A. Hausman (born 1946, Weirton, West Virginia), US econometrician, developed "Hausman Specification Test"
 The Hausman test, or Hausman specification test, a statistical test in econometrics, named after Jerry A. Hausman
 Jonathan Hausman (born 1957), American Conservative rabbi
 Michael Hausman (born 19??), US percussionist and manager, cofounded United Musicians
 René Hausman (born 1936), Belgian comic-book writer and artist
 Tom Hausman (born 1953, Mobridge, South Dakota), US baseball player
 Walter Ader Hausman, Chilean chess master

Haussmann, Haußmann or Hauszmann 
Two prominent German families bear this name or variants.

Haußmann of Oberboihingen 
The first prominent German family called Haußmann originated in Reudern, near Oberboihingen in Württemberg, the earliest known member being Hans Haußmann, born circa 1450, died before 1526. From this family descended several politicians and actors. Descendants of his sons, who resided in Oberboihingen, include:
 Ezard Haußmann (1935–2010), German actor
 Leander Haußmann (also Haussmann) (born 1959, Quedlinburg), German actor, theatre- and film director

Other people 
 Alajos Hauszmann (1847–1926), Hungarian architect of Bavarian origin
 Elias Gottlob Haussmann (1695, Gera – 1774, Leipzig)
 Emil Haussmann (1910–1947), German SS-officer charged with crimes against humanity
 Georges-Eugène Haussmann (commonly known as Baron Haussmann) (1809-1891), French official who rebuilt Paris into a modern city
 Hans Haußmann (1900–1972), German field hockey player
 Helmut Haussmann (born 1943), German academic and politician
 John Houseman, born Jacques Haussmann (1902–1988), Jewish French-Romanian/US actor and film producer
 Michael Haussman (born 19??), director, writer, and producer
 Valentin Haussmann (died c. 1611), German composer
 William M. Haussmann Sr. (1906-1988), architect

See also 
 Hausmannstätten
 Hausmania
 Hausmannite
 Housman
 Houseman (disambiguation)
 Agricola (disambiguation), Latin translation

References

Further reading 
 Werner Haussmann: Das Haussmann Buch. Nürtingen, 1994, 
 Ronald Hausmann: website - kisselsandclassiccars.com

German-language surnames
Jewish surnames
Occupational surnames